"Sweet Harmony" is a song by British dance act Liquid, originally released on the Liquid EP in 1991, and as a single in 1992. The song samples heavily from CeCe Rogers' "Someday" released in 1987. New remixes of the song were released in 1995, and it was re-released in 2004 and again in 2007, featuring more new mixes.

In the UK, the original 1992 version peaked at No. 15; the 1995 release at No. 14; and the 2004 release at No. 87.

Charts

Danny Byrd version

English drum and bass DJ and producer Danny Byrd released his version in 2010. It was the first single released from his third album Rave Digger. The song was released on 1 February 2010 as a digital download and 12". It peaked at number 64 on the UK Singles Chart, making it his first chart entrance.

Track listing

Chart performance
"Sweet Harmony" managed to peak to number 64 on the UK Singles Chart and number 6 on the UK Dance Singles Chart.

Release history

References

1991 songs
1992 debut singles
1995 singles
2004 singles
2010 singles
Liquid (musician) songs
Danny Byrd songs
XL Recordings singles
Hospital Records singles
Music Week number-one dance singles